The 2022 Gainesville mayoral election took place on November 8, 2022, electing the new Mayor of Gainesville, Florida. Incumbent mayor Lauren Poe is term-limited and cannot seek re-election. Gainesville City Commissioner Harvey Ward, after narrowly leading in the first round, defeated former Gainesville Regional Utilities Manager Ed Bielarski by just over 15 points.

Candidates

Declared
David Arreola, city commissioner
Ed Bielarski, former Gainesville Regional Utilities manager
Ansaun Fisher, sports management executive
Gary Gordon, former mayor
Gabriel Hillel, slavery reparations activist
Adam Rosenthal, tech worker
Donald Shepherd, retired University of Florida groundskeeper and perennial candidate
July Thomas, astrophysicist
Harvey Ward, city commissioner and former mayor pro temp

Primary Election

General Election

References

Gainesville
Gainesville
History of Gainesville, Florida